Belgium competed at the 1968 Summer Paralympics in Tel Aviv, Israel from November 4 to 13, 1968. The team finished twentieth in the medal table and won a total of six medals; three silver and three bronze.

Medals 
The team finished twentieth in the medal table and won a total of six medals; three silver and three bronze.

See also 
 Belgium at the 1968 Summer Olympics

References

Nations at the 1968 Summer Paralympics
1968
Paralympics